The 1984 St. Louis Cardinals season was the team's 65th year with the National Football League and the 25th season in St. Louis. Despite finishing with the same 9–7 record as their division rivals Dallas and New York, the Giants made the playoffs based upon the best head-to-head record among the three teams.

The Cardinals’ 6,345 offensive yards in 1984 was third in the NFL, and the most in team history. Their 423 points were fourth-best in the league.

This was the Cardinals' last winning season in St. Louis. The franchise moved to Arizona in 1988, and did not enjoy a winning season there until 1998.

Offseason

NFL draft

Personnel

Staff

Roster

Regular season

Schedule

Standings

Awards and records 
 Neil Lomax, led NFC, touchdown passes, 28 passes

Milestones 
 Franchise led NFC in passing yards, 4,257 yards passing 
 Ottis Anderson, 5th season, 1,000 rushing yards in one season, 1,174 yards 
 Neil Lomax, franchise record, most passing yards in one season, 4,614 yards 
 Neil Lomax, tied franchise record, most touchdown passes in one season, 28 Passes
 Neil O’Donoghue, tied franchise record, most points scored in one season, 117 Points

Notes

References 

 Cardinals on Pro Football Reference
 Cardinals on jt-sw.com

St. Louis
Arizona Cardinals seasons